The Prince Edward Island Scotties Tournament of Hearts is the Prince Edward Island provincial women's curling tournament. The tournament is run by Curl PEI, the provincial curling association. The winning team represents Prince Edward Island at the Scotties Tournament of Hearts.

Past winners

References

External links
List of winners

See also

Scotties Tournament of Hearts provincial tournaments
Curling competitions in Prince Edward Island